The NOVUS Summit is an annual summit held in New York City. First held on July 17, 2016, the summit is a partnership with the United Nations Department of Economic and Social Affairs in support of the Sustainable Development Goals. The Summit leverages Science, Innovation, and Technology to unite Humanity around the 17 Sustainable Development Goals as set by the  United Nations General Assembly.

NOVUS was founded by Kunal Sood as part of his capstone at the University of Pennsylvania.

History
The inaugural summit took place on July 17, 2016, at the United Nations General Assembly. The event brought in thought leaders from the public and private sectors to highlight the dire need for accelerating the use of exponential technologies to solve some of world’s most urgent and pressing challenges.
Among those featured  were engineer Anousheh Ansari, psychologist Martin Seligman, Jacque Fresco, astronaut Scott Parazynski, Robert Swan, primatologist Isabel Behncke Izquierdo, Lakshmi Puri, Roya Mahboob, entrepreneur Peter Diamandis, Parisa Khosravi, Vikram Gandhi, Maye Musk, and the founder of the World Toilet Organization, Jack Sim.
There was also a performance by Ricky Kej.

In May 2017, the annual conference produced the first-ever SDG Innovation event in partnership with the Office of the President of the General Assembly. H.E. Peter Thomson, the former President of the General Assembly of the United Nations, headlined the event along with Deputy Secretary-General of the United Nations Amina J. Mohammed.

During the July 2019 event, as part of the Summits’ aim to improve education worldwide, it honored Val Kilmer. Kilmer was given a symbolic award to honor his work with the TwainMania Foundation, which is dedicated to teaching art literacy and education to people around the world. The charitable foundation was founded by Kilmer, whose inspiration is American writer, Mark Twain, who was the focus of his one-man show, Cinema Twain, and subsequent curriculum development. His mission is to educate American high school students to improve their critical thinking and media literacy skills and also develop an appreciation for democracy. 
In July 2020, the annual event, NOVUS Global X Impact: The Decade of Transformation, was convened as the organization's first virtual summit. This summit sought to lay the foundation for social impact as part of its Social Impact Revolution with various session talks live-streamed globally.

See also
 X Prize Foundation
 MIT Solve
 TED (conference)
 Singularity University
 Nexus Global Youth Summit
 NEXUS (non-profit)
 Summit Series (conference)

References

United Nations Economic and Social Council
Sustainable development
Sustainable Development Goals